Edin Dervišhalidović (born on 12 September 1962), known professionally as Dino Merlin, is a Bosnian singer-songwriter, musician, and record producer. Born in Sarajevo, he was the founder and leader of Merlin, which eventually became one of the best-selling rock-bands of Southeast Europe.

Nicknamed "The Wizard", he is considered one of the most prominent and commercially successful artists ever to emerge from former Yugoslavia.

Dino is recognized for his later solo work, which established him as one of the best-selling regional artists of all time. Over the course of his career, he has produced over a dozen chart-topping albums, held several record-breaking tours, won many awards including the Sixth April Award of Sarajevo, and has authored the first national anthem of Bosnia and Herzegovina. He is widely known for his distinctive voice, stage performances and poetic lyrics.

Early life
Edin Dervišhalidović was born on 12 September 1962, in the historic neighbourhood of Alifakovac in Sarajevo, PR Bosnia and Herzegovina (at the time part of Yugoslavia). The Dervišhalidović family traces its origins to Novi Pazar. Dino's father, Abid, was a carpenter who came to Sarajevo as a teenager. His mother, Fatima (née Činjarević), was born and raised in Sarajevo, and was a Muslim clerk. His parents divorced when he was 7 years old,, and he was subsequently raised by his mother.

Dino attended the historic Moris Moco Salom elementary school, where he was the captain of the school's soccer, basketball and table tennis teams. The school and its historic surroundings – Emperor's Mosque, President Tito's residence  and Hotel Nacional – all influenced his later art.

On his mother's insistence, and contrary to his own wishes of attending music school, Dino enrolled into the Sarajevo Technical High School. During after-school hours, he performed in a music duo with his childhood friend and keyboard player Mirsad Lutvica with whom he later established the band, Merlin.

Music career

Early years
Although Dino's mother was against the idea of her son being a musician, she helped Dino buy his first guitar when he was 12 years old. After learning his first chords, Dino began writing his own melodies and lyrics. He penned his first song at 14 years old. Dino was mostly self-taught although he did take a couple lessons from an older neighbour called Mirsad. Mirsad's younger brother, Mensur Lutvica, played the keyboard and attended the same school as Dino. They soon became best friends and eventually became the founding members of the later band 'Merlin'. Mensur began accompanying Dino while performing on the streets of Sarajevo.

Dino was heavily influenced by the Yugoslavian musicians Bijelo Dugme, Zdravko Čolić, Kemal Monteno, Toma Zdravković, among others. He entered several music competitions covering the songs of the aforementioned artists. He would later become close friends with Goran Bregovic, the founder and primary songwriter of Bijelo Dugme.

After enrolling in university, Dino formed a band, with Mensur on keyboards, Amir "Tula" Bjelanović on guitar, Džafer Saračević on drums and Enver Milišić on bass guitar. Each of the five put a paper with their idea for a band name in a hat; the name "Merlin" was the first to be pulled out of the hat, which they named the band.

First album, period of struggle
After completing his first semester at university, Dino soon dropped out, in order to pursue a music career. However, he did not have enough money to enter a recording studio. During this time, he married his high-school sweetheart Amela, and soon found himself working two shifts a day at a metal factory in the suburbs of Sarajevo in order to support his newly formed marriage. Dino ended up working in a factory for a couple of years before earning enough money to consider making an album. It was during the long nights at the assembly lane that he started writing most of the songs which would later be present in his first LP.

In 1984, Dino entered a local studio in Sarajevo owned by producer Brano Likić. All of the songs recorded were written by Dino while the fees of the recording were paid from Dino's personal funds. During this time, Dino was rejected by every major record label in Sarajevo. At the same time, Dino's private funds were only enough for about 6 songs with the norm of the time being 10 songs for a proper album. During the recording session of the final song, a local A&R agent Muradif Brkić entered the studio where Dino and Brano were mixing a song, which later turned out be Kokuzna Vremena. After listening to the track, a couple of times, Muradif offered Dino a contract with his record label "Sarajevodisk" on the spot and agreed to finance the remainder of the song recordings. Eventually, Merlin was able to release his first album in 1985 with the leading single Kokuzna vremena - the same song which gave Dino and his band a lifeline into the music industry.
With the band, he has recorded 5 studio albums: Kokuzna vremena in 1985, Teško meni sa tobom in 1986, Merlin in 1987, Nešto lijepo treba da se desi in 1989, and Peta strana svijeta in 1990.

Solo career

Dervišhalidović began his solo career under the name Dino Merlin in 1991, and has since recorded six studio albums: Moja bogda sna in 1993, Fotografija in 1995, Sredinom in 2000, Burek in 2004, Ispočetka in 2008 and Hotel Nacional in 2014.

During the Bosnian War, several members of the band "Merlin" were killed in the attacks, including their long-time manager Kemal Bisić with whom Dino was particularly close. Dino suffered a period of depression during which he contemplated abandoning music altogether.

As Dino was the sole songwriter for the band, and produced most of their work, it was no surprise that he went on a solo career. Not long after the band dissolved, Merlin was invited by the Bosnian state government to write its first ever national anthem "Jedna si jedina". The song had acted as the state's national anthem until the late 1990s.
In 1993 he wrote the song and eventually participated in Bosnia's first Eurovision Song Contests, in Millstreet in 1993. Dino authored the song "Sva bol svijeta" (trans. "All the grief in the world"). The song was about the hardships the people in his home country were enduring during the war and called for peace. He again participated in the Eurovision Song Contests in Jerusalem in 1999 (singing Putnici with Béatrice, a French singer) and in 2011 with Love in Rewind. Dino Merlin has also taken part in other big European festivals, such as Copenhagen in 1996 and Turkovision in 1997.

Breaking records, major success

In 2000, aged 38, Dino wrote and released his most successful album to date - the famous "Sredinom" (trans. Middle). The album was the top-selling album in Bosnia and Herzegovina and was sold in all of the former Yugoslav republics.

The album eventually turned into a classic and became the highest selling album of the region in the last 30 years. Some estimates put the album sales at about 2,000,000 - a record breaking success considering that the whole population of Yugoslavia was about 20,000,000 people.

The subsequent tour promoting his Sredinom album included over 200 concerts, with a spectacular record-breaking performance at the Koševo Olympic Stadium in Sarajevo, in front of an audience of about 80,000. This was the largest crowd ever to assemble on the national stadium in Bosnia's history. Dino subsequently performed 3 more times at this stadium and is the only artist ever to have filled this venue to capacity on 4 occasions.

Current success, Billboard recognition
After a 6-year hiatus, Dino returned to the stage with his eleventh album Hotel Nacional. It was released in June 2014 and was featured in the top 10 on the Billboard World Albums list immediately upon release due to unprecedented online sales in the region. This is the only album from the Slavic-speaking Europe ever to be charted on the prestigious Billboard list. The album featured a star-studded line up of Yoad Nevo, Richard Niles, Husnu Senlendirici, and many other producers that have worked for globally renowned music acts such as Sugababes, Morcheeba, Lisa Ekdahl, Sophie Ellis-Bextor and many others. The Hotel National World Tour has had a box office success of 700,000 people that have attended concerts across 4 continents. It is the largest tour ever to have been produced by an artist from Southeast Europe.

Towards the end of 2019, Dino posted a teaser for a new song which was to be released, titled 'Mi'. Dino released the song in October 2019, followed by 'Dođi' at the start of 2021, and then with two more songs ('Mir svim dobrim ljudima' and 'Jedan dan, jedna noć') in May.

Personal life
Dino resides in his hometown of Sarajevo, in the same house and street where he was born and raised, in the historic neighbourhood of Alifakovac. He has two children. His daughter, Naida, earned her bachelor's degree from Buckingham University and master's degree at Oxford University. His son, Hamza, graduated from the Boğaziçi University in Istanbul and earned his master's degree at University of Westminster in London.

Dino is an avid chess player, skier, art collector and book reader. He also owns a record label and concept store in the centre of Sarajevo, in the old city centre of Baščaršija.

Philanthropy
Although Dino likes to keep his humanitarian activities private and out of public sight, it is known that he is an active donor of scholarships to underprivileged children in Bosnia and Herzegovina. He is a long-time member of the Hastor Foundation, the biggest organization of its kind devoted to distributing scholarships to primary and high-school students in the country. Dino acts as a sponsor to over dozen students every year and has been a member of this programme since 2008.

Dino worked for 5 years pro bono as the honorary and de facto president of the assembly of AMUS- the main association of music artists of Bosnia. He has been one of the founding members of this organization in 2013. In early 2018 he resigned from his position as president due to the lack of available time at his disposal to run the association.

During his career he has played numerous charity concerts. During the great floods, which have affected the region, Dino's team was heavily involved in humanitarian works - distributing water, food, blankets and other provisions to the most endangered parts of Bosnia and Serbia.

In 2013, Dino was awarded the International Humanitarian Award in Şanlıurfa, Turkey.

Discography

Albums

With Merlin
Kokuzna vremena (1985)
Teško meni sa tobom (a još teže bez tebe) (1986)
Merlin (1987)
Nešto lijepo treba da se desi (1989)
Peta strana svijeta (1990)

Solo career
Moja bogda sna (1993)
Fotografija (1995)
Sredinom (2000)
Burek (2004)
Ispočetka (2008)
Hotel Nacional (2014)

Compilation albums
The Best of Dino Merlin (2001)

DVDs
Live Koševo 2004 (2005)
Koševo 19. Juli (2009)
Beograd 2011 (2016)
Hotel Nacional - Koševo 2015 (2016)

Blu-rays
Arena Zagreb (2018)
Arena Pula (2020)

Singles
1989: "Kad zamirišu jorgovani" (with Vesna Zmijanac)
1991: "Ja joj trijezan prići ne smijem" (from Yugoslav comedy film "Bračna Putovanja")
1993: "Zaboravi" (Collaborated with Ceca)
1995: "Beograd" (Collaborated with Ceca)
1997: "Zaspao je mjesec"
1999: "Putnici" (with Béatrice Poulot)
1999: "Smijehom strah pokrijem"
2000: "I have no cannons that roar" (with Yusuf Islam)
2001: "Tako prazan" (with Adi Lukovac)
2002: "Pustite me" (with Osman Hadžić)
2005: "Kako starim, sve te više volim" (Collaborated with Bata Zdravković)
2006: "Kao moja mati" (with Zdravko Čolić)
2007: "Otkrit ću ti tajnu"
2008: "Med" (with Emina Jahović)
2011: "Love in Rewind"
2011: "Undo"
2014: "Ruža" (with Hüsnü Şenlendirici)
2020: "Mi"
2020: "Dođi" (with Senidah)
2021: "Jedan dan, jedna noć"
2022: "Krive karte"
2022: "Kako da ti kažem"

Tours
Kokuzna vremena Yugoslavian Tour (1985–1986)
Teško meni sa tobom Yugoslavian Tour (1986–1987)
Nešto lijepo treba da se desi European Tour (1988–1989)
Fotografija Balkan Tour (1997–1998)
Sredinom World Tour (2000–2003)
Burek World Tour (2004–2007)
Ispočetka World Tour (2008–11)
Hotel Nacional World Tour (2014–2019)

References

External links

Official Website

 

1962 births
Living people
Singers from Sarajevo
Musicians from Sarajevo
Bosniaks of Bosnia and Herzegovina
20th-century Bosnia and Herzegovina male singers
Bosnia and Herzegovina singer-songwriters
Eurovision Song Contest entrants for Bosnia and Herzegovina
Eurovision Song Contest entrants of 1999
Bosnia and Herzegovina rock singers
Eurovision Song Contest entrants of 2011
Bosnia and Herzegovina songwriters
Bosnia and Herzegovina folk-pop singers
National anthem writers
Yugoslav male singers